Cnemaspis alwisi, also known commonly as Alwis' day gecko or Alwis's day gecko, is a species of diurnal lizard in the family Gekkonidae. The species is endemic to the island of Sri Lanka.

Etymology
The specific name, alwisi, is in honor of Sri Lankan zoologist Lyn de Alwis (1930–2006) for his work in wildlife conservation.

Description

Reproduction
C. alwisi is oviparous.

References

Further reading
Somaweera R, Somaweera N (2009). Lizards of Sri Lanka, A Colour Guide with Field Keys. Frankfurt am Main: Edition Chimaira / Serpents Tale. 304 pp. .
Wickramasinghe LJM, Munindradasa DAI (200&). "Review of the genus Cnemaspis Strauch, 1887 (Sauria: Gekkonidae) in Sri Lanka with the description of five new species". Zootaxa 1490: 1–63. (Cnemaspis alwisi, new species, pp. 5–6).

External links
Photo at flickr

Cnemaspis
Endemic fauna of Sri Lanka
Reptiles of Sri Lanka
Reptiles described in 2007